A wholesale list is a piece of compilational media (collection of information) providing details for various wholesale companies. One can use a wholesale list to save hours of researching about wholesaling companies as the producer of a wholesale list will already have done it. For example, a wholesale list may contain details of companies which sell computers at wholesaler prices to customers. Someone wanting to buy computers at wholesale prices need not spend time and effort hunting for the companies, as there is already a wholesale list on that product existing.

List Providers
There are many companies providing wholesale lists, some better than others, some free, some for a small price.

Generally, those lists that require a fee to view, may not be updated frequently, the data may be old, and the companies listed may no longer be in business. While this may also be the case with a free list, since there is no investment, nothing has been risked, or lost as the retailer searches for new trading partners.

The web has many free wholesale list resources, that do not require a membership or fee to view the sources. The lists are sorted by product category, making it quick and easy to find a specific product line.

Some wholesale list websites have internet forums. Those forums may be frequented by companies who are less than desirable, but promote themselves under a false user name, giving a testimonial indicating they have bought from the supplier, and had an excellent transaction. Use caution when seeing "Testimonials" of past buyers. Verify all contact information, and if you have any doubts, pass the wholesaler up.

Selecting a vendor
When viewing a wholesale list it is best to do to three things before selecting a vendor as a new trading partner. First, check their Better Business Bureau (BBB) rating if the company is in the United States or Canada.

Then, check the internet Whois to see how long the wholesale company has been on the web, who owns the website, and who the webmaster of the website is. Check to see that contact information in the Whois, at the Better Business Bureau and on the wholesale supplier's website contact page, all match. If they don't match, ask the supplier why there are numerous addresses. See if the area code of the phone numbers all match as well.

As a final step before purchasing from a new trading partner, if the company is in the United States, check the Federal Trade Commission (FTC) site for complaints against the company. The FTC has lists of complaints filed against internet companies. They show letters sent to the company, tell if the case went to court, explain how the case was resolved, including any fines levied against the company. In some cases, companies committing internet fraud are shut down by the FTC. The FTC has a complaint area on their site, for online complaint submission.

Scamming and safety
Wholesale lists offered for sale may be scams as it is easy to compile a list and the consumer has no way of checking that the list is accurate and not out of date ahead of time. It is easy to do one's own research on the internet or the public library instead.

Wholesaling